Barbaxonella is a genus of mites belonging to the family Aturidae.

The species of this genus are found in Europe.

Species:
 Barbaxonella angulata (Viets, 1955) 
 Barbaxonella bingolensis

References

Trombidiformes
Trombidiformes genera